Shahrak-e Ghadir Navaygan (also Romanized as Shahrak-e Ghadīr Navāygān; also known as Shahrak-e Ghadīr) is a village in Qaleh Biyaban Rural District, in the Central District of Darab County, Fars Province, Iran. At the 2006 census, its population was 714, in 194 families.

References 

Populated places in Darab County